James Sutherland (born 1881, deceased) was a Scottish professional association footballer who played as a winger. He started his career with Caledonian in his native Inverness, before moving to Football League First Division side Burnley in 1899. He stayed in Lancashire for two seasons, making eleven league appearances and scoring one goal.

References

1881 births
Year of death unknown
Footballers from Inverness
Scottish footballers
Association football wingers
Burnley F.C. players
English Football League players
Caledonian F.C. players
Highland Football League players